"Feeling Good" (also known as "Feelin' Good") is a song written by English composers Anthony Newley and Leslie Bricusse for the musical The Roar of the Greasepaint – The Smell of the Crowd. It was first performed on stage in 1964 by Cy Grant on the UK tour and by Gilbert Price in 1965 with the original Broadway cast.

Nina Simone recorded "Feeling Good" for her 1965 album I Put a Spell on You. The song has also been covered by Sammy Davis Jr., Traffic, Michael Bublé, John Coltrane, George Michael, Victory, Eels, Joe Bonamassa, Eden, Muse, Black Cat Bones, Bassnectar, Sophie B. Hawkins, Leslie West, Avicii, Chlöe Palaver Strings & Kebra-Seyoun Charles, and Lauryn Hill among others. It was also performed by John Legend as part of the Celebrating America performance marking the inauguration of Joe Biden and Kamala Harris on January 20, 2021.

Early performances and recordings
Although Bricusse and Newley shared songwriting credits, the words of the song are usually attributed to Bricusse, with the music by Newley. The song was first performed in public by Guyanese-British singer and actor Cy Grant on the opening night of The Roar of the Greasepaint – The Smell of the Crowd at the Theatre Royal in Nottingham on 3 August 1964. The show, directed by Newley, toured British provincial theatres, and was then taken to the US by theatre producer David Merrick.  It opened on 16 May 1965 at the Shubert Theatre in New York City, where the role of "the Negro", who sings "Feeling Good", was taken by Gilbert Price.

In the show, Price's character is asked to compete against the show's hero "Cocky"; but, as "Cocky" and his master "Sir" argue over the rules of the game, "the Negro" reaches the centre of the stage and "wins", singing the song at his moment of triumph. It was described as a "booming song of emancipation", and a Billboard review said it was "the kind of robust number that should have strong appeal". The original cast recording of the show, featuring Price's version of the song, was released by RCA Victor in early 1965, before the show reached New York.

A version by Cy Grant with pianist Bill Le Sage – much jazzier than the original stage version – appeared on their 1965 album . Anthony Newley's own recording appeared on his 1965 album "Who Can I Turn To" and other songs from "The Roar of the Greasepaint". One of the earliest recorded versions was a jazz treatment by saxophonist John Coltrane, which appeared on his album The John Coltrane Quartet Plays.... Recorded on 18 February 1965, it also features Art Davis, Elvin Jones and McCoy Tyner. Versions were also released in 1965 by Nina Simone, Jean DuShon, Julie London, Chris Connor, Billy Eckstine, Andy & The Bey Sisters and Sammy Davis Jr.
Ed Ames recorded a version in 1966 on his album "It's a Man's World".

Chart versions

Nina Simone

Nina Simone's version, arranged and produced by Hal Mooney, was recorded in New York in January 1965 and appeared on her album I Put a Spell on You. It was not released as a single at the time. In 1994, Simone's recording was used in a British TV commercial for Volkswagen, and became popular. Released as a single, it reached No. 40 on the UK Singles Chart in July 1994.

Simone's version was remixed by Joe Claussell in 2002 for the first volume of the Verve Remixed series.

The vocal track by Nina Simone and the music of "Feeling Good" have been sampled in numerous songs. In 1997, it was sampled in "Feeling Good" by Huff & Herb. Other uses include "How I Feel" by Wax Tailor, from the 2005 album Tales of the Forgotten Melodies; "New Day" from the debut collaborative studio album Watch the Throne by American rappers Jay-Z and Kanye West in 2011; "How I Feel" by Flo Rida, from the 2013 album The Perfect 10; and, also in 2013, in the beginning of Bassnectar's Immersive Music Mixtape Side One.

The track "About You" on Mary J. Blige's 2005 album The Breakthrough features an unusual take on the song. The bulk of the recording consists of new lyrics, composed by Mary J. Blige, will.i.am and Keith Harris; however, the chorus samples several lines from "Feeling Good" as performed by Nina Simone. Simone's original vocals are distorted so much that her voice is almost unrecognisable; for this reason, Simone receives a credit as a featured artist, and Newley and Bricusse receive credit as co-writers. "About You" is produced by will.i.am. The original instrumental track to Nina Simone's "Feeling Good" was also used in the Swedish musician Avicii's song of the same name, used by Volvo.

Simone's recording was used in the film Point of No Return and appears on soundtracks for the movies Repo Men (2010), Last Holiday (2006), Professor Marston and the Wonder Women (2017), 
Cruella (2021), the TV soundtrack Six Feet Under, Vol. 2: Everything Ends and the 2009 video game The Saboteur. The Bassnectar/Simone cover was used in "Chapter 6", a first-season episode of the television series Legion and in the television show Scandal.

An official music video for Simone's version was released on YouTube 56 years after the release of her recording in June 2021.

Certifications

Muse

The English rock band Muse recorded a version for their 2001 album Origin of Symmetry. It was released as a single also featuring the song "Hyper Music".

In a poll by Total Guitar about best cover songs, Muse's version came fifth. In September 2010, NME readers voted it the greatest cover song of all time, over "Twist and Shout" by the Beatles and "Hurt" by Johnny Cash. A BBC poll in 2014 placed it ninth.

Muse's version reached No. 137 on the singles chart in France, and No. 24 on the singles chart in the UK.

Michael Bublé

"Feeling Good" was covered by Canadian singer Michael Bublé as the lead single from his album It's Time. The single was released on 4 April 2005. The song was the opening track on his live album Caught in the Act and has appeared in television advertisements, ESPN's 2005 World Series of Poker tournament, and the 2010 NBA draft broadcast.

Chart performance
The single peaked at No. 162 in the United Kingdom, No. 70 in Australia, No. 36 in Germany, No. 66 in Austria, and No. 14 in Poland. The song has become one of his most popular singles and became a hit in May 2010, when it reached No. 69 on the UK Singles Chart after it was featured in British advertisements.

Sales and certifications

Music video
A music video was released to accompany the single.  It features Buble in a nuclear power plant, reminiscent of James Bond and other 1960s secret agent movies.

The Pussycat Dolls

American girl group the Pussycat Dolls recorded "Feeling Good" for their debut studio album, PCD (2005). The song was sung entirely by the Dolls' lead singer, Nicole Scherzinger.

Reception 
The Pussycat Dolls' version of "Feelin’ Good" received mixed reviews from critics. Nick Butler of Sputnikmusic wrote that the song's inclusion on the album serves as "a pretty pointless vocal workout for Nicole". John Murphy from musicOMH gave a negative review, writing: "All the emotion and melodrama of the original is ripped out of the heart of the song and we're left with a pointless, faux-jazz version. They may as well have strutted over to [Nina] Simone's grave and performed a stiletto clad dance upon it." Sal Cinquemani of Slant Magazine commented that the "rendition of 'Feelin' Good' [...] is misguided at best". In contrast, Spence D. of IGN praised the song for returning to the "retro vibe with wondrous results". On the Billboard Smooth Jazz Songs chart, the song peaked at number 23, becoming The Pussycat Dolls' only song to appear on that chart.

Live performances 
The song is included on their 2006 Live from London as the fourth track of the DVD. The song is performed solely by Scherzinger. The song was also included on their first headlining tour, PCD World Tour. While delivering an a cappella version of the song, Scherzinger wore a "virginal hoodie-cum-headscarf", reported Helen Pidd of The Guardian.

George Michael

George Michael performed "Feeling Good" during his 2011–12 Symphonica Tour and included it on the Symphonica album (2014). The music video was released on 6 May 2014, and "Feeling Good" was sent to radio on 11 August 2014. The release of "Feeling Good" coincided with the issue of Symphonica on the vinyl format. It became his final single before his death in 2016.

The studio version of "Feeling Good" was recorded by Michael in 2008 (with actress Loretta Devine featured prominently on backing vocals) and included on the US edition of his Twenty Five compilation. He also performed it during the 2008 legs of his 25 Live tour and the 2010 George Michael Live in Australia concerts.

Release history

References

External links
 Lyrics of this song
 

1964 songs
Songs written by Anthony Newley
Songs written by Leslie Bricusse
Songs from musicals
Nina Simone songs
George Michael songs
Eels (band) songs
Frank Sinatra songs
Michael Bublé songs
Philips Records singles
Mushroom Records singles
143 Records singles
Reprise Records singles
A&M Records singles
Song recordings produced by George Michael